The 1998 RCA Championships was a tennis tournament played on outdoor hard courts. It was the 11th edition of the event known that year as the RCA Championships, and was part of the Championship Series of the 1998 ATP Tour. It was the 11th edition of the tournament and took place at the Indianapolis Tennis Center in Indianapolis, Indiana, United States.

Seeds
Champion seeds are indicated in bold text while text in italics indicates the round in which those seeds were eliminated.

Draw

Finals

Top half

Bottom half

References

Atlanta Open (tennis)
Doubles